Scourfieldiaceae is a family of green algae in the order Scourfieldiales.

References

External links

Green algae families
Pedinophyceae